Franz Födermayr (13 September 1933 – 4 April 2020) was an Austrian musicologist.

Life 
Born in Grieskirchen, Upper Austria, Födermayr studied musicology from 1954 at the University of Vienna with Erich Schenk (doctorate 1964). From 1964 to 1974 he worked as a university assistant at the musicological institute of the university, and in 1972 he received his habilitation.

From 1973 he held the professorship for comparative musicology at the University of Vienna, where he became emeritus in 1999. From 1986 he served as president of the Österreichische Gesellschaft für Musikwissenschaft for four years. From 1987 to 1997 he was a member of the board of directors of the International Musicological Society.

Publications 
 Die musikwissenschaftlichen Phonogramme Ludwig Zöhrers von den Tuareg der Sahara, Dissertation, Vienna 1964
 Zur gesanglichen Stimmgebung in der außereuropäischen Musik, 1971
 with Rudolf Flotzinger and Josef-Horst Lederer edition of the MusAu 6 (1986)

Further reading 
 Barbara Boisits: Födermayr, Franz. In Oesterreichisches Musiklexikon online, 2001 
 Franz Födermayr: Födermayr, Franz. In MGG Online, November 2016 (Die Musik in Geschichte und Gegenwart, 2001)

References 

1933 births
2020 deaths
Austrian ethnomusicologists
Members of the Austrian Academy of Sciences
University of Vienna alumni
Academic staff of the University of Vienna
People from Upper Austria